The men's 10,000 metres event at the 1972 Summer Olympics in Munich was held on 31 August and 3 September. This event featured a qualifying round for the first time since the 1920 Summer Olympics in Antwerp. The favorites in the event included Belgium's Emiel Puttemans, Great Britain's Dave Bedford, and Finland's Lasse Virén.

The men's 10,000 metres final was notable for Lasse Virén's world record performance. At the start of the race, Bedford led the pace; he maintained a world record pace at the 4000 m mark, and he still led halfway through the race. On the 12th lap, just before the halfway point, Virén and Tunisia's Mohammed Gammoudi, 10,000 m bronze medalist and 5000 m gold medalist in the 1968 Summer Olympics in Mexico City, tangled into each other and fell onto the track. Both recovered, and while Gammoudi fell out of the race two laps later, Virén caught up to the front and passed Bedford to take the lead at about the 6000 m mark.

With Virén leading for the rest of the race, the lead pack reduced to five competitors with 600 m remaining when he made his charge. He ran the final lap (the last 400 m) in 56.4 seconds; he won the gold medal, beating runner-up Puttemans by 7 m and setting a world record time of 27:38.35. Virén would go on to win the 5000 metres event, where he would set an Olympic record there; he also went on to win both the 10,000 metres and 5000 metres races at the 1976 Summer Olympics in Montreal.

The Guardian listed Virén's world record performance as the greatest sport comeback of all time.

Heats
The top four runners in each of the three heats (blue) and the next three fastest (green), advanced to the final round.

Heat one

Heat two

Heat three

Final

Sources

References

Men's 10,000 metres
10,000 metres at the Olympics
Men's events at the 1972 Summer Olympics